Early legislative elections were held in Indonesia on 7 June 1999. They were the first elections since the fall of Suharto and end of the New Order, and the first free elections in Indonesia since 1955. With the ending of restrictions on political activity following the fall of Suharto, a total of 48 parties contested the 462 seats up for election in the People's Representative Council. A further 38 seats were reserved for members of the armed forces.

Background
Under the New Order, only two political parties forcibly merged in 1973 – Indonesian Democratic Party (PDI) and United Development Party (PPP) – plus the functional group Golkar had been allowed to participate in elections. With the start of the Reform Era, more than 100 new political parties emerged. New elections were called for 1999 and 148 parties registered with the Ministry of Justice and Human Rights. Of these, only 48 passed the selection process, overseen by intellectual Nurcholish Madjid. The elections were to be overseen by an independent General Elections Commission (KPU) of 53 members, one from each party and five government representatives.

Electoral system
The system used was based on closed party-list proportional representation at the provincial level. Within each province, parties were awarded seats in proportion to their share of the vote. The East Java province had the most number of seats, with 82, while the lowest was in Bengkulu and East Timor with four each.

Campaign

The official election campaign began on 19 May 1999 and ended on 4 June to allow two 'rest days' before the vote itself. It was divided into three stages, with different parties being allowed to campaign on different days. However, before the campaign, there was violence between supporters of rival parties. Four people were killed in fighting between followers of the United Development Party (PPP) and the National Awakening Party (PKB) on 1 May and three more died in clashes between Golkar and Indonesian Democratic Party-Struggle (PDI-P) supporters on 11 May.

On the first day of the campaign, there was a parade of party vehicles in Central Jakarta. The Golkar float was attacked and damaged The traffic circle in front of Hotel Indonesia was a popular spot for rallies. Meanwhile, there was an increase of people heading for Singapore to escape possible violence as polling day neared, with one newspaper reporting that more than 78,000 people had left.

As well as rallies, the major parties took out full-colour advertisements in newspapers. Each party was also given air time TV for statements by lone spokespeople. There were also ads in the newspapers urging people to use their vote.

In the final week, the main parties held huge rallies in the capital: the PKB on 1 June, the National Mandate Party (PAN) on 2 June, the PDI-P on 3 June and Golkar on 4 June, at which its supporters were attacked.

At one minute past midnight on 5 June, all party flags, banners and posters began to be removed as the campaign officially ended. International observers continued to arrive to oversee the election, among them former US president Jimmy Carter.

Polling day
In the last few days before the vote on 7 June, newspapers carried advertisements sponsored by the Indonesian Election Committee (PPI) explaining how to vote and urging people to do so.

On the day itself, polls opened at 8 am. People cast their vote by piercing the party symbol on the ballot paper and then dipped a finger in indelible ink to prevent repeat voting. When the votes were counted, each ballot paper was held up for onlookers to see.

There was independent monitoring down to the level of polling stations by Indonesians as well as by 100 observers and support staff from 23 counties led by Jimmy Carter. On polling day, Carter said that it would have been extremely difficult to manipulate the election data because of the well-prepared information network and because the information was easy to access. One way the public could access the latest results was by sending a short message service text to a specific number. The sender then received information about provincial or party results.

On 9 June, Carter's team reported that although there had been "shortcomings" and allegations of financial abuses, they did not appear to have had a significant impact on the polling day activities.

Results
The count was slow, with votes taking several weeks to count. Before he left Indonesia, Carter expressed his concern about this  At a meeting at the General Election Commission building on 26 June, only 22 of the 53 members of the commission were prepared to accept the result. These comprised the representatives of 17 of the parties (with 93% of the vote between them) and the five government representatives. Eventually, later that same day President Bacharuddin Jusuf Habibie in a live TV broadcast declared the results were valid. The PDI-P, led by Megawati Sukarnoputri, had won the largest share of the vote with Golkar in second place.

The process of allocating seats in the People's Representative Council took several months with the PPI announcing the results on 1 September. A total of 21 parties had won seats, with the PDI-P being awarded 153 and Golkar 120. There were ten parties with only one seat each.

Results by province

Presidential election

On 20 and 21 October 1999, about four months after the legislative elections, the People's Consultative Assembly elected the President and Vice President of Indonesia for the 1999–2004 term. Abdurrahman Wahid was elected president and Megawati Sukarnoputri as vice president.

References
 
 
 Evans, Kevin Raymond, (2003) The History of Political Parties & General Elections in Indonesia, Arise Consultancies, Jakarta, 
 Friend, Theodore (2003) Indonesian Destinies, The Belknap Press of Harvard University Press, 
 Loveard, Keith, (1999) Suharto: Indonesia's Last Sultan, Horizon Books, Singapore, 
 Liddle, R. William, The 1977 Indonesian and New Order Legitimacy, South East Asian Affairs 1978, Translation published in Pemilu-Pemilu Orde Baru, LP3ES, Jakarta, 
 
  Salomo Simanungkalit et al. (Eds) (2004) Peta Politik Pemilhan Umum 1999-2004 (Political Map of General Elections 1999-2004) Buku Kompas, Jakarta

Notes

Legislative elections in Indonesia
Indonesia
Legislative
Indonesian legislative election
People's Consultative Assembly